The West Branch Pleasant River is a  tributary of the Piscataquis River in Piscataquis County, Maine.

The Appalachian Trail crosses the West Branch at The Hermitage Preserve in Bowdoin College Grant East (T.7 R.10 NWP). The Hermitage contains a roughly  grove — one of the few stands of old-growth Eastern White Pine remaining in New England. Just upstream from The Hermitage is Gulf Hagas, a  water-formed canyon.  The river falls  in the canyon, including multiple waterfalls. Gulf Hagas and The Hermitage are among the 14 National Natural Landmarks in Maine, designated in 1968 and 1977 respectively.

See also
 List of rivers of Maine
 Katahdin Iron Works

References

Maine Streamflow Data from the USGS
Maine Watershed Data From Environmental Protection Agency

Tributaries of the Penobscot River
Rivers of Piscataquis County, Maine
Rivers of Maine